The linear city was an urban plan proposed in 1965 by Michael Graves and Peter Eisenman for a 34 kilometer-long linear settlement between New Brunswick and Trenton, New Jersey. If built, the proposed city would have been 1.6 kilometers wide.

See also 
 Arcology

References 
https://www.dwell.com/article/linear-city-048250fc

Proposed populated places in the United States